Democracy & Freedom Watch is an online newspaper based in Tbilisi and published by the Georgian NGO Journalists for the Future. It carries news stories, political commentary and reports on the democratic development in Georgia and its neighboring territories.

Overview 
The trilingual website publishes in English, Georgian and Russian.

Apart from news stories about Georgia, the site also covers Russia's North Caucasus republics, as well as the disputed territories of Abkhazia and South Ossetia.

It is supported financially by Open Society Foundations, the National Endowment for Democracy and Friedrich Ebert Foundation, and also has online advertising.

References

External links
English-language website

European news websites